Yaarron Ka Yaar is a 1977 Bollywood film, starring Shatrughan Sinha, Leena Chandavarkar in lead roles and directed by A. Bhimsingh. The music was composed by Kalyanji-Anandji.

Plot

Low-caste Nathu becomes a proud father of a son, and is asked to fetch some water to clean the child. When he goes to the well, he finds it dry, and goes on to a private pond, owned by Zamindar Jaimal Singh. In Jaimal's house too there is merry-making as his wife has given birth to a baby boy as well, and preparations are made to name the child. When Jaimal finds out that Nathu has polluted the water, he takes his men and severely beats up Nathu, leaving his crippled, and sets fire to the entire village. Nathu loses his son, and is unable to locate his pregnant wife. Angered at this injustice, he abducts Jaimal's son, and disappears into the night. Years later, crippled Nathu has nurtured Jaimal's son, named him Shera, and has taught him how to be a thief. Shera has learned well, but is apprehended and arrested by the police and sent to jail. After his return, Nathu tells him the atrocities inflicted by Jaimal, and Shera swears to avenge this, and sets about to destroy Jaimal and his family. Will Shera succeed in his venture?

Cast

Shatrughan Sinha as Pratap / Shera 
Leena Chandavarkar as Bindiya 
Premnath as Nathu 
Helen as Rita 
Ramayan Tiwari as Jaimal Singh  
Indrani Mukherjee as Shakuntala (Jaimal's Daughter) 
Achala Sachdev as Dhanno (Nathu's Wife)  
Ramesh Deo as Shekhar 
Asit Sen as Milk Seller   
Yunus Parvez as Money Lender 
Marutirao Parab as Police Constable

Soundtrack

External links
 

1977 films
1970s Hindi-language films
Films directed by A. Bhimsingh
Films scored by Kalyanji Anandji